Photinia lasiogyna is a species of flowering plant in the family Rosaceae. It is endemic to China.  It is threatened by habitat loss.

References

External links
 Flora of China entry

lasiogyna
Endemic flora of China
Vulnerable plants
Taxonomy articles created by Polbot